G.I.T. on Broadway, also known as Diana Ross and The Supremes and The Temptations on Broadway, is a 1969 television special produced by Motown Productions and George Schlatter-Ed Friendly Productions. The special, a follow-up to 1968's successful TCB program, is a musical revue starring Motown's two most popular groups at the time, Diana Ross and The Supremes with the Temptations. Containing primarily Broadway showtunes, the special was taped in mid-1969 and originally broadcast November 12, 1969 on NBC. Like TCB, the title of the program was derived from an acronym, this one standing for "Gettin' It Together".

A soundtrack album for the special, titled Diana Ross and The Supremes and The Temptations on Broadway, was issued five days before the program aired. Though there were no singles released from this album in the US, "The Rhythm of Life" did become a Top 10 hit for the ensemble in Australia.

Two months after its release, Diana Ross left The Supremes to embark upon a solo career.

Cast
Diana Ross & The Supremes:
Diana Ross
Mary Wilson
Cindy Birdsong
The Temptations:
Dennis Edwards
Eddie Kendricks
Paul Williams
Melvin Franklin
Otis Williams

Song list of TV special
"G.I.T On Broadway"
Broadway Medley
"The Rhythm of Life"
"Malteds over Manhattan"
Medley:
"It Ain't Necessarily So"
"Summertime"
"Fiddler on the Roof Medley"
"The Student Mountie"
"Leading Lady Medley"
"Let the Sunshine In"
"Funky Broadway"
"G.I.T. On Broadway Reprise"

Song list for Soundtrack Album
"G.I.T On Broadway"
Broadway Medley
"Malteds over Manhattan"
"Leading Lady Medley"
Fiddler on the Roof Medley
"The Student Mountie"
"The Rhythm of Life"
Finale: "Let the Sunshine In"
"Funky Broadway"
"G.I.T. On Broadway" (Reprise)

Awards for TV special

The show won the Primetime Emmy Award for Outstanding Achievement in Costume Design - Bob Mackie; National Broadcasting Company (NBC)

Availability on home media

As of January 2019, the show has not been officially released on home video. Various clips are available for viewing online by streaming media sites, including YouTube.

In 2017, the vinyl LP soundtrack album has been remastered and reissued on CD in the U.S. (Motown, MS699).

Charts

Notes

References

External links
 

1960s American television specials
1969 in American television
1969 soundtrack albums
1969 television specials
Diana Ross soundtracks
Motown soundtracks
Music television specials
Television soundtracks
The Supremes soundtracks
The Temptations soundtracks